Padiyathalawa is a small town in Ampara District, Sri Lanka.

Attractions
 Padiyadora Raja Maha Vihara is an ancient Buddhist temple located close to the Padiyathalawa town. The temple is an archaeologically protected monument.

 Wahawa hot water springs.
 Nawinna Rajamaha Wiharaya is an ancient temple situated 5km away from the town.

References

External links 
Administrative Map of Padiyathalawa from UN HIC

Villages in Ampara District
Padiyathalawa DS Division